Zhi Lai Zhi Wang (simplified Chinese: 职来职往; traditional Chinese: 職來職往; literally "the capable deserve the job")  is a Chinese job-hunting reality show hosted by Lixiang (李响). It is co-produced by Jiangsu Television and China Education Channel. It was first broadcast on December 10, 2010, and currently airs on Thursday and Friday nights at 21: 38 on China Education Channel, and Tuesday nights at 21:10 on Jiangsu Satellite TV.

General introduction
Zhi Lai Zhi Wang helps job-seekers to make proper evaluation about themselves and their career and provides them with diverse job opportunities. The show involves various vocations and lives. Through the conversation between the employers and the job-seekers, the reality show presents on the screen the heated discussion of job-hunting and the collisional sparkle of opinions from different perspectives.

Zhi Lai Zhi Wang invites 18 career talents from all trades and professions to decide whether the job-hunter is capable of their company's job by asking questions and evaluating their performances. Meanwhile, these career talents offers precious suggestions concerning choosing a job and choosing a company to job-hunters on a case-by-case basis.

Four Units of the Show

The 1st Unit: Appearance on the Stage

These career talents judge job-hunters according to their self-introduction, style of conversation, dresses and etiquette.

The 2nd Unit: Skill Appraisal

Job hunters' job skills are evaluated in this section and at the same time, their psychological quality and critical reasoning ability are tested in a roundabout manner.

The 3rd Unit: Job-hunting Story

In this unit, career talents find job hunters' strengths through their VCR and learn more about their qualities, characters and personalities.

The Final Unit: Job Temptation

The Job hunters have come so far and it's time for a final decision. Whether they are offered a job or get refused? The result comes out immediately with comments and suggestions.

MR. JOB of Zhi Lai Zhi Wang

MR. JOB is to job seekers who are confused and helpless when deciding their career choices what the lighthouse is to ships which lose their sea routes and cannot figure out the right direction.

The EX-MR. JOB of the show is Lei Ming, a law graduate, psychologist, administrant and trainer of corporation. He is experienced in psychological cases and consultation.

The CURRENT-MR. JOB is Pan Li with 20-year experience in administrative jobs in domestically renowned companies. He has rich experience in employee' recruitment, team leading and, especially, the stimulation and cultivation of young employees.

Chinese reality television series
2010 Chinese television series debuts